Reliance was built at Bristol in 1831. She appeared in Lloyd's Register (LR) in 1832 with G.Forester, master, Hilhouse, owner, and trade Bristol–Trinidad.

Reliance was driven ashore and wrecked at Rockaway, New York, on 10 March 1836. She was on a voyage from Bristol to New York City.

Citations and references
Citations

References
 

1831 ships
Ships built in Bristol
Age of Sail merchant ships of England
Maritime incidents in March 1836